Alaman (also Romanized as Alāman; also known as Elāyen and Ţalāben) is a village in Estarabad Rural District, Kamalan District, Aliabad County, Golestan Province, Iran. At the 2006 census, its population was 135, in 39 families.

References 

Populated places in Aliabad County